Holt McCallany (born Holt Quinn McAloney; September 3, 1963) is an American actor. He is known for portraying FBI Special Agent Bill Tench on the series Mindhunter (2017–2019) and has had leading and supporting roles in various television series and films, including Lights Out, Fight Club, Three Kings, Shot Caller, Wrath of Man and Nightmare Alley, and the upcoming The Iron Claw.

Early life and education
McCallany was born September 3, 1963, in New York City, to theatrical parents. His mother, Julie Wilson (1924–2015), was an American singer and actress, "widely regarded as the queen of cabaret." His father, Michael McAloney (1924–2000), was an Irish actor and producer best known for his Tony Award-winning production of Brendan Behan's Borstal Boy, an autobiographical play about a young member of the Irish Republican Army, which was the first Irish production to win top honors on Broadway.

Because his father wanted a classical education for his two sons, McCallany and his younger brother were sent to live with another family in Dublin, while his parents stayed in New York City, working. In Ireland, he attended the National School in Howth. However, following his parents' divorce the children moved back to the United States. He attended school first in New Jersey and was later sent to live with his maternal grandparents in Omaha, Nebraska, where he had a troubled childhood and was expelled from Creighton Preparatory School. At the age of 14, he ran away from home and took a Greyhound bus to Los Angeles to pursue his dream of becoming an actor, but ended up with a job in a factory unloading trucks. His parents eventually tracked him down and sent him back to Ireland to a boarding school in County Kildare that his father had attended forty years earlier, Newbridge College.

He soon left Ireland and eventually was allowed to return to Creighton Preparatory School, and graduated in 1981. After high school, he went to France to continue his education, first to study French at the Sorbonne and art at the Paris American Academy, and later theater at L'École Marcel Marceau and L'École Jacques Lecoq. McCallany spent a summer studying Shakespeare at Oxford University and went with a production of Twelfth Night to the Edinburgh Fringe Festival before moving to New York City to begin his professional acting career.

Career
His first job in the professional theater was as an apprentice actor at the Great Lakes Shakespeare Festival in Cleveland, Ohio, in the same apprenticeship once served by Tom Hanks, among others. Subsequently, he returned to New York City and was cast as an understudy in the Broadway production of Biloxi Blues.

McCallany landed a series of supporting parts in such films as Casualties of War, Alien 3, Creepshow 2, The Search for One-eye Jimmy and Jade, as well as the TV miniseries Rough Riders. After playing the legendary boxing trainer Teddy Atlas in the HBO telefilm Tyson, he became a supporter of the Atlas Foundation Charity, a grassroots organization dedicated to helping children and families with medical and financial hardships.

He continued working in films and television throughout the nineties and 2000s with roles in films such as Fight Club, Three Kings, Men of Honor and Below, among others. He played a detective with psychological problems in CSI: Miami and a soldier with post-traumatic stress disorder on Criminal Minds.

He appeared in the 2010 Warner Bros. film, The Losers, based on the graphic novel from DC Comics. McCallany also was the star of the 2011 FX television series, Lights Out, playing an aging boxer ("Patrick 'Lights' Leary") forced out of retirement and into a comeback bid to regain the heavyweight title, despite having pugilistic dementia.

He followed this with roles in films like Sully, Shot Caller and Blackhat, among many others.

From 2017 to 2019, McCallany co-starred in the Netflix series Mindhunter for director David Fincher. He played Bill Tench, an FBI agent researching serial killers in the late 1970s. His first French-language film, an adaptation of the George Feydeau comedy Le Dindon, was released in September 2019.

Filmography

Film

Television

Video games

References

External links
 
 
 

1963 births
Living people
20th-century American male actors
21st-century American male actors
American male film actors
American male television actors
American male voice actors
American people of Irish descent
Male actors from New York City
Male actors from Omaha, Nebraska